Alan North (born 15 August 1953), is a South African former professional Grand Prix motorcycle road racer. His best year was in 1982 when he finished the season in sixth place in the 350 cc world championship. He won his only Grand Prix race in 1977 when he claimed the 350 cc 1977 Nations Grand Prix at Imola.

North was born in Durban, South Africa. His parents were heavily involved in Natal motorsport in the early days of Roy Hesketh Circuit. His father was chairman of NMCC, and before that his grandfather also.

When North turned 16, he began his racing career on 50 cc bikes on the karting tracks, and at club meetings at the Roy Hesketh Circuit. North raced at the Roy Hesketh Circuit from 1969 through to the end of 1974, moving up the ranks from 50 cc to 750 cc during those years.

References

External links 
 Roy Hesketh Circuit Heritage

1953 births
Sportspeople from Durban
South African motorcycle racers
250cc World Championship riders
350cc World Championship riders
500cc World Championship riders
Living people